Shahriyar Rahimov (born on 6 April 1989 in Baku) is an Azerbaijani football player. He plays for Zira in the Azerbaijan Premier League.

Career

Club
On 19 July 2020, Rahimov signed a two-year contract with Zira FK.

International
Rahimov spent 12 matches under Azerbaijan U21 form (both official and friendly) and scored goal in a friendly match against Moldovian peers. 

On 23 March 2018, Rahimov made his senior international debut for Azerbaijan against Belarus.

Career statistics

International

Statistics accurate as of match played 19 November 2019

References

External links
 

1989 births
Living people
Azerbaijani footballers
Azerbaijan under-21 international footballers
Azerbaijan international footballers
Shamakhi FK players
FK Karvan players
AZAL PFK players
Ravan Baku FC players
Kapaz PFK players
Sabail FK players
Zira FK players
Azerbaijan Premier League players
Footballers from Baku
Association football defenders